Husky are an indie folk band from Melbourne, Australia. They have opened for Neil Young, Devendra Banhart, Gotye, The Shins.

History

2007-2013: Quiet Little Rage & Forever So
In 2007, the band recorded and mixed an album at Sing Sing Recording Studios in Melbourne, with all songs written and produced by Husky Gawenda. The album was released in 2008 under the title Quiet Little Rage. In 2011 and prior to release of Forever So Gawenda said "Unfortunately that record didn't get a proper release. We didn't have a label, didn't have any money, didn't know what we were doing. We did everything ourselves, even publicity. It never really got heard [so] to call that our first album would be inaccurate; it's more like a demo, even though we put a lot of work into it."

In March 2011, Husky uploaded "History's Door" onto Triple J Unearthed, which gained attain. Gideon Preiss said "Things started to escalate after Unearthed; we had been doing everything ourselves for a while, but we couldn't be across everything any more; there was too much happening. That's a great problem to have" and the band signed manager, Bonnie Dalton, who looks after record label Liberation.

The band's official debut singles were "Dark Sea" and "History's Door" in August 2011. In October 2011 Husky released Forever So, which was recorded in Gawenda's backyard. The album debuted at number 33 on the ARIA Charts. 

Beat Magazine said "Husky's official debut album Forever So is intimate, affecting and richly textured. Drummer Luke Collins and bassist Evan Tweedie provide deft touches to these carefully-crafted songs, while Californian producer Noah Georgeson captures Husky's aesthetic superbly by working closely with Gawenda and Preiss in the mixing of the album."

At the J Awards of 2011, Husky were nominated for Unearthed Artist of the Year at the J Awards of 2011. 

In February 2012 Husky became the first Australian band to be signed to Sub Pop records, who released Forever So internationally. Husky Gawenda appeared on RocKwiz on 14 July 2012.

At the ARIA Music Awards of 2012, Forever So was nominated for an ARIA Award.

On 25 March 2013, Husky Gawenda won the bi-annual Professional Development Award at the APRA Awards (Australia).

2014-2019: Ruckers Hill & Punchbuzz
In 2014, Husky commenced promotion for their second album Ruckers Hill. It was released in October 2014 and peaked at number 29 on the ARIA Charts. The album spawned three singles and in December 2014 Husky Gawenda won first prize for the Vanda and Young International Song Writing Competition for song "Saint Joan".

Late 2016, Husky announced the release of an upcoming third record for 2017. The first single "Late Night Store" was released in November 2016 and a video was premiered at the same period on HighClouds. In June 2017 the band released their third album Punchbuzz. The album peaked at number 32 on the ARIA Charts. The album  saw them branch out from their folky-acoustic roots to a more synthy sound, inspired by a year of living in Berlin.

This was followed in October with the EP Bedroom Recordings..

2020: Stardust Blues
In August 2020, Husky released their fourth studio album Stardust Blues. The album was written partly in the Westbury Hotel, an old building in the Melbourne suburb of Balaclava. A sharehouse at the time, members of the band had lived there for years before it was demolished in late 2019.

Discography

Studio albums

Demos

Extended plays

Singles

As lead artist

As featured artist

Awards and nominations

AIR Awards
The Australian Independent Record Awards (commonly known informally as AIR Awards) is an annual awards night to recognise, promote and celebrate the success of Australia's Independent Music sector.

|-
| AIR Awards of 2012
|themselves
| Breakthrough Independent Artist
| 
|-

APRA Awards
The APRA Awards are held in Australia and New Zealand by the Australasian Performing Right Association to recognise songwriting skills, sales and airplay performance by its members annually. 

|-
| 2013
| themselves
| Professional Development Awards (Pop)
| 
|-

ARIA Music Awards
The ARIA Music Awards is an annual awards ceremony that recognises excellence, innovation, and achievement across all genres of Australian music. 

|-
| 2012
| Forever So
| Best Adult Contemporary Album
| 
|-

EG Awards / Music Victoria Awards
The EG Awards (known as Music Victoria Awards since 2013) are an annual awards night celebrating Victorian music. They commenced in 2006.

|-
|rowspan="2"|  EG Awards of 2012
| Husky
| Best Band
| 
|-
| Husky
| Outstanding Achievement By a Victorian Artist
| 
|-

J Award
The J Awards are an annual series of Australian music awards that were established by the Australian Broadcasting Corporation's youth-focused radio station Triple J. They commenced in 2005.

|-
| J Awards of 2011
| themselves
| Unearthed Artist of the Year
|

Vanda & Young Global Songwriting Competition
The Vanda & Young Global Songwriting Competition is an annual competition that "acknowledges great songwriting whilst supporting and raising money for Nordoff-Robbins" and is coordinated by Albert Music and APRA AMCOS. It commenced in 2009.

|-
| 2014
| "Saint Joan"
| Vanda & Young Global Songwriting Competition
| style="background:gold;"| 1st

References

External links

Australian folk music groups
Musical groups from Melbourne
Musical groups established in 2007
2007 establishments in Australia